Ewell is both a surname and a given name. Notable people with the name include:

Surname:
Barney Ewell (1918–1996), American athlete
Benjamin Stoddert Ewell (1810–1894), United States and Confederate army officer
Dana Ewell (born 1971), convicted murderer
Don Ewell (1916–1983), American jazz pianist
Dwight Ewell (born 1968), American actor
Julian Ewell (1915-2009), United States Army Lieutenant General
Kayla Ewell (born 1985), American actress
Marshall Davis Ewell (1844–1928), American lawyer
Patricia Lynch Ewell (1926–2011), former U.S. ambassador to Madagascar
Peter Rawlinson, Baron Rawlinson of Ewell (1919–2006), English politician
Philip Ewell (active since 2001), American music theorist and cellist
Richard S. Ewell (1817–1872), Confederate general
Tom Ewell (1909–1994), American actor

Given name:
Ewell Blackwell (1922–1996), Major League pitcher
Ewell Ross McCright 1917–1990), U.S. Air Force captain
James Ewell Brown Stuart (1833–1864), Confederate cavalry general

Fictional characters
Robert E. Lee (Bob) Ewell and daughter Mayella, characters in Harper Lee's 1960 novel To Kill a Mockingbird

English-language surnames
English toponymic surnames